Magnetic dip, dip angle, or magnetic inclination is the angle made with the horizontal by the Earth's magnetic field lines. This angle varies at different points on the Earth's surface. Positive values of inclination indicate that the magnetic field of the Earth is pointing downward, into the Earth, at the point of measurement, and negative values indicate that it is pointing upward. The dip angle is in principle the angle made by the needle of a vertically held compass, though in practice ordinary compass needles may be weighted against dip or may be unable to move freely in the correct plane. The value can be measured more reliably with a special instrument typically known as a dip circle. 

Dip angle was discovered by the engineer Georg Hartmann in 1544. A method of measuring it with a dip circle was described by Robert Norman in England in 1581.

Explanation 

Magnetic dip results from the tendency of a magnet to align itself with lines of magnetic field. As the Earth's magnetic field lines are not parallel to the surface, the north end of a compass needle will point upward in the southern hemisphere (negative dip) or downward in the northern hemisphere (positive dip) . The range of dip is from -90 degrees (at the South Magnetic Pole) to +90 degrees (at the North Magnetic Pole). Contour lines along which the dip measured at the Earth's surface is equal are referred to as isoclinic lines. The locus of the points having zero dip is called the magnetic equator or aclinic line.

Calculation for a given latitude 
The inclination  is defined locally for the magnetic field due to the Earth's core, and has a positive value if the field points below the horizontal (ie into the Earth).

Outside Earth's core we consider Maxwell's equations in a vacuum,  and  where  and the subscript  denotes the core as the origin of these fields. The first means we can introduce the scalar potential  such that , while the second means the potential satisfies the Laplace equation .

Solving to leading order gives the magnetic dipole potential 

 

and hence the field 

 

for magnetic moment  and position vector  on the Earth's surface. From here it can be shown that the inclination  as defined above satisfies (from )

where  is the latitude of the point on the Earth's surface.

Practical importance 
The phenomenon is especially important in aviation, as it causes the airplane's compass to give erroneous readings during banked turns and airspeed changes. The latter errors occur because the compass card tilts on its mount when under acceleration.

Compass needles are often weighted during manufacture to compensate for magnetic dip, so that they will balance roughly horizontally. This balancing is latitude-dependent; see Compass balancing (magnetic dip).

See also 
 Aircraft compass turns
 South Atlantic Anomaly
 Magnetic declination

References

External links 
 Compass errors
 Look up magnetic dip values

Magnetic field of the Earth
Geomagnetism
Orientation (geometry)